By Faith is the sixth studio album by American Christian singer-songwriter Kim Boyce. It is her second and final album on the Warner Alliance label released in 1994. The album is more adult contemporary, leaving behind her dance pop sound of her previous albums. A music video was made for the second single "Not Too Far From Here."Boyce dedicated the album to her first born son Gary Lee. Boyce released her first all Spanish-language album of By Faith called Por Fe a year later. Bill Cuomo and Robert White Johnson produced three tracks while Bryan Lenox produced the rest of the album.

Track listing

Note: (*) – produced by Bill Cuomo and Robert White Johnson. All other tracks were produced by Bryan Lenox.

Personnel 
 Kim Boyce – lead vocals, backing vocals (1, 3, 4, 5, 7, 8, 9)
 Dennis Patton – programming (1, 3, 7, 9), sequencing (1, 3, 7, 9)
 Bryan Lenox – additional keyboards (1, 3, 4, 5, 7, 8, 9), synth bass (1, 3, 4, 5, 7, 8, 9), additional drums (1, 3, 4, 5, 7, 8, 9), percussion (1, 3, 4, 5, 7, 8, 9)
 Phil Madeira – Hammond B3 organ (1, 3, 4, 5, 7, 8, 9)
 Bill Cuomo – keyboards (2, 6, 10), programming (2, 6, 10), bass (2, 6, 10)
 Bo Cooper – acoustic piano (4, 8), keyboards (4, 8)
 Jerry McPherson – guitars (1-4, 6-10)
 Brent Rowan – guitars (5)
 Jackie Street – bass (1, 3, 4, 5, 7, 8, 9)
 Chris McHugh – drums (1, 3, 4, 5, 7, 8, 9)
 Wayne Killius – drums (2, 6, 10)
 Marty Paoletta – saxophone (1, 3, 4, 5, 7, 8, 9)
 Mark Douthit – saxophone (2, 6, 10)
 Ronn Huff – string arrangements and conductor (1, 3, 4, 5, 7, 8, 9)
 Nashville String Machine – strings (1, 3, 4, 5, 7, 8, 9)
 Eric Champion – backing vocals (1, 3, 4, 5, 7, 8, 9)
 Gary Koreiba – backing vocals (1, 3, 4, 5, 7, 8, 9)
 Angelo Petrucci – backing vocals (1, 3, 4, 5, 7, 8, 9)
 Veronica Petrucci – backing vocals (1, 3, 4, 5, 7, 8, 9)
 Mark Pogue – backing vocals (1, 3, 4, 5, 7, 8, 9)
 Chris Rodriguez – backing vocals (1, 3, 4, 5, 7, 8, 9)
 Nicol Smith – backing vocals (1, 3, 4, 5, 7, 8, 9)
 Robert White Johnson – backing vocals (2, 6, 10)
 Kim Keyes – backing vocals (2, 6, 10)

Production and Technical
 Eric Wyse – executive producer, A&R direction
 Gregg Jampol – track recording (1, 3, 4, 5, 7, 8, 9), overdub recording (1, 3, 4, 5, 7, 8, 9), string recording (1, 3, 4, 5, 7, 8, 9), additional mixing (1, 3, 4, 5, 7, 8, 9)
 Bryan Lenox – track recording (1, 3, 4, 5, 7, 8, 9), overdub recording (1, 3, 4, 5, 7, 8, 9), string recording (1, 3, 4, 5, 7, 8, 9), mixing (1, 3, 4, 5, 7, 8, 9)
 Scott Lenox – overdub recording (1, 3, 4, 5, 7, 8, 9), string recording (1, 3, 4, 5, 7, 8, 9), second engineer (1, 3, 4, 5, 7, 8, 9), production assistant (1, 3, 4, 5, 7, 8, 9)
 Bill Cuomo – recording (2, 6, 10), mixing (2, 6, 10)
 Mark Ralston – second engineer (1, 3, 4, 5, 7, 8, 9)
 Aaron Swihart – second engineer (1, 3, 4, 5, 7, 8, 9), additional mixing (1, 3, 4, 5, 7, 8, 9)
 Hank Williams – mastering at MasterMix (Nashville, Tennessee)
 Laura LiPuma-Nash – art direction 
 Glenn Parsons – design 
 Peter Nash – photography

Radio singles

References

External links

1994 albums
Kim Boyce albums
Warner Music Group albums